Petronilho de Brito(31 May 1904 – 1983/4), was an association footballer who played forward, and who played for the Brazil national team. He died about 1983 or 1984, in São Paulo.

Club career
Born in São Paulo, Petronilho de Brito spent most of his career defending clubs of that city. He played for Antárctica-SP, Minas Gerais-SP, Sírio-SP and Independência-SP, winning the Campeonato Brasileiro de Seleções Estaduais in 1926, representing the state of São Paulo, and being awarded as the competition's top goalscorer with 13 goals, before moving to San Lorenzo of Argentina in 1930. He won the Primera División Argentina in 1933, retiring in 1936.

International career
Petronilho de Brito played five games for the Brazilian national team between 1928 and 1935. He played his first game on June 24, 1928, against Motherwell of Scotland, and scored his first goal for Brazil on February 24, 1929, against Rampla Juniors of Uruguay. Petronilho played his last game for the country on February 24, 1935, against River Plate of Argentina.

Personal life
He is the brother of former footballer Waldemar de Brito.

Honours

Club
San Lorenzo
Primera División Argentina: 1933

State of São Paulo
Campeonato Brasileiro de Seleções Estaduais: 1926

Individual
Campeonato Brasileiro de Seleções Estaduais top goalscorer (13 gols): 1926

References

1904 births
1984 deaths
Brazilian footballers
Brazilian expatriate footballers
Argentine Primera División players
San Lorenzo de Almagro footballers
Expatriate footballers in Argentina
Brazil international footballers
Footballers from São Paulo
Association football forwards